

In terminology management 
In terminology management, a termbase, or term base (a contraction of terminology and database), is a database consisting of concept-oriented terminological entries (or ‘concepts’) and related information, usually in multilingual format. Entries may include any of the following additional information:
 a definition; 
 source or context of the term; 
 subject area, domain, or industry; 
 grammatical information (verb, noun, etc.); 
 notes; 
 usage label (figurative, American English, formal, etc.); 
 author (‘created by’), 
 creation/modification date (‘created/modified at’);
 verification status (‘verified’ or ‘approved’ terms), and
 an ID.

A termbase allows for the systematic management of approved or verified terms and is a powerful tool for promoting consistency in terminology.

In computer science 

In a broader sense, "term base" in computer science is used to designate any resource that provides terminology information. In addition to term bases in the terminological sense, this includes knowledge graphs and ontologies.

See also
 Translation memory
 Glossary
 Dictionary
 Controlled vocabulary

References

 Wright, Sue Ellen & Budin, Gerhard. Handbook of terminology management (Volume 2): Application-oriented terminology management. John Benjamins Publishing Company, 9 Mar 2001.

External links
Terminology Management from the SDL Translationzone.com website 
What is a Termbase? from the Multiterm.com website 
What is a termbase? from the WebWordSystem website

Applied linguistics
Computer-assisted translation
Lexicography
Terminology
Translation